Vaughan and Vaughn are surnames, originally Welsh, though also used as a form of the Irish surname McMahon. Vaughan derives from the Welsh word bychan, meaning "small", and so corresponds to the English name Little and the Breton cognate Bihan. The word mutates to Fychan an identifier for a younger sibling or next of kin. It can also be used as a first name Vaughan (given name).

Notable people with the surname Vaughan

A
Adam Vaughan (born c. 1961), Canadian politician
Alfred Jefferson Vaughan Jr. (1830–1899), American civil engineer, planter, soldier and writer
Alden Vaughan, American historian
Anne Vaughan, Countess of Carbery (1663–1689/90)
Arky Vaughan (1912–1952), American professional baseball player
Arthur Owen Vaughan (1863–1919), English-born writer, soldier and Welsh nationalist

B
Benjamin Vaughan (1751–1835), British politician
Benjamin Vaughan (bishop) (1917–2003), Bishop of Swansea and Brecon in the Church in Wales
Benji Vaughan, British psychedelic trance and psybient musician
Bernard Vaughan (1847–1922), English Roman Catholic clergyman
Bernard Vaughan (actor) (early 20th century), British silent film actor
Beryl Vaughan (1919-2016), American actress
Bob Vaughan (born 1945), British mathematician
Brian K. Vaughan (born 1976), American comic book and television writer
Bruce Vaughan (born 1956), American professional golfer
Byrde M. Vaughan (1862–1941), American lawyer and politician

C
Charles John Vaughan (1816–1897), English scholar and churchman
Clyde Vaughan, American basketball coach and player
Colin Vaughan (1931–2000), Canadian television journalist, architect, urban activist and politician
Crawford Vaughan (1874–1947), Australian politician, Premier of South Australia 1915–1917

D
Daniel Vaughan (1897–1975), Irish politician and farmer
David Vaughan (disambiguation), several people
Denis Vaughan (born 1926), Australian-born orchestral conductor and multi-instrumentalist
Diana Vaughan, fictitious character in the 1890s Taxil hoax
Don Vaughan (ice hockey) (born 1961), Canadian ice-hockey coach and former player
Don Vaughan (landscape architect) (born 1937), American landscape architect
 Dorothy Vaughan (1910–2008), African American mathematician
 Dustin Vaughan (born 1991), American football player

E
Edwin Campion Vaughan (1897–1931), British Army officer and diarist

F
Frankie Vaughan (1928–1999), British singer

G
Genevieve Vaughan (born 1939), American expatriate semiotician, peace activist, feminist, and philanthropist
Gerard Vaughan (British politician) (1923–2003), British psychiatrist and politician
Greg Vaughan (born 1973), American actor

H
Hal Vaughan (1928–2013), American author based in France
Harp Vaughan (1903–1978), American football player
Harry Vaughan (disambiguation), several people

Hayley Vaughan, fictional character from American TV series All My Children
Henry Vaughan (disambiguation), several people

Herbert Vaughan (1832–1903), English cardinal
Herbert Millingchamp Vaughan (1870–1948), Welsh author and historian
Horace Worth Vaughan (1867–1922), American lawyer, jurist, and politician

I
Ivan Vaughan (1942–1993), British musician, teacher and author, introduced John Lennon to Paul McCartney

J
James Vaughan (disambiguation), several people

Dame Janet Vaughan (1899–1993), British physiologist, Principal of Somerville College, Oxford
Jimmie Vaughan (born 1951), American guitarist and singer
John Vaughan (disambiguation), several people
Johnny Vaughan (born 1966), English broadcaster and journalist
Jon the Dentist, British music record producer
Justin Vaughan (born 1967), English-New Zealand doctor and cricket executive

K
Kaye Vaughan (born 1931), Canadian football player
Keith Vaughan (1912–1977), British painter
Kenny Vaughan, American guitarist
Kit Vaughan (born 1953), South African professor of biomedical engineering

M
Malcolm Vaughan (1929–2010), Welsh traditional pop music singer and actor
Mark Vaughan (born 1985), Irish Gaelic footballer
Martin Vaughan (born 1931), Australian actor
Megan Vaughan, British historian 
Michael Vaughan (born 1974), English cricketer
Mike Vaughan (born 1954), American football player with Oklahoma Sooners
Murray Vaughan (c. 1900–1986), Canadian philanthropist

N
Nigel Vaughan (born 1959), Welsh professional footballer
Norman D. Vaughan (1905–2005), American dogsled driver and explorer
Norman Vaughan (comedian) (1927–2002), English comedian

P
Paul Vaughan (1925–2014), British journalist and radio and TV presenter
P. W. Vaughan (1871–1945), Australian bank manager
Peter Vaughan (disambiguation), several people

 Philip Vaughan (18th century), Welsh inventor of the ball bearing

R
Ralph Vaughan Williams (1872–1958), English composer
Rhydian Vaughan (born 1988), Taiwanese-British actor
Rice Vaughan (died c. 1672), Anglo-Welsh lawyer and economist
Richard Vaughan (disambiguation), several people
R. M. Vaughan (born 1965), Canadian poet, novelist and playwright
Robert Vaughan (disambiguation), several people
Roger Vaughan (disambiguation), several people
Rowland Vaughan (disambiguation), several people

S
Sarah Vaughan (1924–1990), American jazz singer
Sarah Vaughan (writer) (born c. 1973), British journalist and writer
Scipio Vaughan (1784–1840), American artisan
Scooter Vaughan (born 1989), American ice hockey player
Stephen Vaughan (disambiguation), several people
Stevie Ray Vaughan (1954–1990), American guitarist, singer-songwriter and record producer
Stoll Vaughan, American singer-songwriter

T
Terri Vaughan, American economist
Thomas Vaughan (disambiguation), several people
Tom Vaughan (disambiguation), several people
Tony Vaughan (born 1975), English footballer
Sir Tudor Vaughan (1870–1929), British diplomat

V
Vernon H. Vaughan (1838–1878), American politician
Victor C. Vaughan (1851–1929), American physician, medical researcher, and AMA President

W
William Vaughan (disambiguation), several people

Notable people with the surname Vaughn
Andrew Vaughn (baseball) (born 1998), American professional baseball player
Billy Vaughn (1919–1991), American musician
Carrie Vaughn (born 1973), fantasy writer
Chad Vaughn (born 1980), American weightlifter
Chico Vaughn (1940–2013), American basketball player
Chip Vaughn (born 1985), American football safety for the New Orleans Saints
Countess Vaughn (born 1978), actress
Danny Vaughn, rock singer
Deuce Vaughn (born 2001), American football player
Gloria Vaughn (1936–2020), American politician
Greg Vaughn (born 1965), American baseball player
Hilda Vaughn (1898–1957), American actress
Jacque Vaughn (born 1975), American basketball player and coach
Jane Vaughn (Degrassi character), fictional character in Degrassi: The Next Generation
John C. Vaughn (1824–1875), Confederate Brigadier General in the American Civil War
Jon Vaughn (born 1970), American football running back and kick returner
Ke'Shawn Vaughn (born 1997), American football player
Kwame Vaughn (born 1990), American basketball player for Maccabi Haifa
Matt Vaughn, American college baseball coach
Matthew Vaughn (born 1971), film producer, director, married to Claudia Schiffer
Michael Vaughn (disambiguation)
Mo Vaughn (born 1967), American baseball player
Ricky Vaughn, fictional character played by Charlie Sheen in Major League and sequels
Robert Vaughn (1932–2016), stage, film and television actor
Robert Vaughn (Montana rancher) (1836–1918), Welsh American and Montana pioneer
Stephen Vaughn, official at the Office of the United States Trade Representative
Terri J. Vaughn, American actress
Tom Vaughn (disambiguation), several people
 Tom Vaughn (musician) (1937–2011), American jazz pianist and Episcopalian priest
 Tom Vaughn (American football) (1943–2020), former professional American football safety
Vince Vaughn (born 1970), American film actor, screenwriter, producer, comedian and activist
William J. Vaughn (1834–1912), American academic
William S. Vaughn (1903–1996), American businessman and philanthropist

See also
Vaughan-Lee
Vaughan (disambiguation)
Vaughn (disambiguation)

References

English-language surnames
Welsh-language surnames
Surnames of Welsh origin
Anglicised Welsh-language surnames